Drigh Road Railway Station is a railway station in Karachi, Pakistan, near the Jinnah International Airport. It is situated near Drigh Road Flyover on Sharah-e-Faisal.

The station is a stop for a few trains going "upcountry" and all "down country" express trains. In the past, it was a junction on the Karachi Circular Railway. The station has a booking office, train shed, tuck shop, mosque, advance reservation office, and a parking lot.

Services

Gallery

See also
 List of railway stations in Pakistan
 Pakistan Railways
 Karachi Circular Railway

References

External links
 Time Table for Drigh Road Railway Station
 www.geographic.org

Railway stations in Karachi
Railway stations on Karachi Circular Railway
Railway stations on Karachi–Peshawar Line (ML 1)